Non nobis is the incipit and conventional title of a short Latin Christian hymn used as a prayer of thanksgiving and expression of humility.  
The Latin text is from the Vulgate translation of the Book of Psalms, Psalm 113:9 in Vulgate / Greek numbering (Psalm 115:1 in Hebrew numbering): Nōn nōbīs, Domine, nōn nōbīs, sed nōminī tuō dā glōriam (KJV: "Not unto us, O Lord, not unto us, but to thy name give the glory").

History

Medieval
As part of Psalm 113 (In exitu Israel) it was recited liturgically as part of the Paschal vigil, the celebrants kneeling in a gesture of self-abasement when this verse was reached.

It was reported
that the war flag of the Knights Templar, Baucent, had been inscribed with the verse.

Renaissance
Jean Mouton (c. 1459–1522) composed a motet to a text beginning with the Non nobis to celebrate the birth of a daughter to Louis XII and Anne of Brittany in 1510.

Non nobis Domine is now known in the form of a 16th-century canon derived from two passages in the motet Aspice Domine (a5) by the South Netherlandish lutenist and composer Philip van Wilder, who worked at the English court from c. 1520 until his death in 1554. Van Wilder's motet contains both the two related motifs which were apparently extracted from the motet by a later musician during the reign of Elizabeth I to form the canon subject. Although the two passages are not heard consecutively, they are linked as they both set the text phrase non est qui consoletur ("there is none to console [her]"), which was presumably the text to which the canon was originally sung. 

Van Wilder's motet was widely sung in Elizabethan recusant circles, and is preserved in as many as seven Tudor manuscripts.. It provided a model for Byrd's famous Civitas sancti tui (Ne irascaris Domine Part II). One factor in its popularity was undoubtedly its text, a responsory from the Roman Breviary and Sarum Breviary which was sung during the weeks before Advent. It laments the desolation of the Holy City in language derived from Jeremiah:

Texts of this type (which also feature widely in Byrd's penitential and political motets of the 1580s) were widely read by the Elizabethan recusant community in contemporary terms as expressions of Catholic nostalgia for the old religious order. The Non est qui consoletur canon was probably widely sung in recusant circles with the same connotations. Although this version has not survived in written form, the canon subject was simple enough to have been memorized and transmitted orally.

Early modern period
The next stage in the development of the canon was the text substitution which occurred early in the 17th century. This is clear from the earliest known notated source, the so-called Bull MS (also known as Tisdale's Virginal Book) completed about 1620. There it is given with no text, but it is clear from the contour of the melody and the repeated notes that this version was designed to fit the Non nobis Domine text, which must have been in place by this time.

The new text had a liturgical significance for contemporary listeners which is not immediately obvious today. The words, which form the first verse of Psalm 115 in the Protestant translations of the Psalter, are quoted in the First Collect at Matins in the special Office of thanksgiving instituted by Act of the Parliament of Great Britain following the failure of the Gunpowder Plot in 1605 and added to the Book of Common Prayer.

The psalm text, which forms a focus for the rest of the collect, supplies the background to the new version of the canon, which must have been sung in many loyal Protestant households on 5 November (the anniversary of the discovery of the plot) as an act of thanksgiving for deliverance and a counterblast to the Catholic version. The collect, which remained in the prayer book until 1859, would have served as a constant reminder of the patriotic associations of the Non nobis Domine canon: this does much to explain its continued popularity in the 18th and 19th centuries.  The Matins service, and by association the canon, took on an additional layer of meaning in 1688, when William of Orange, with characteristic political astuteness, landed with his troops on November 5, thus creating an association in the popular imagination between William's invasion and the liberation of the realm from Popery, represented by his predecessor the Catholic King James II. A second collect, giving thanks for the Glorious Revolution, was then added to the service. 

Non nobis Domine appeared in print in Playford's Musical Banquet (1651), Hilton's Catch that catch can (1652) and Playford's Introduction to the Skill of Musick (1655), in all three cases anonymously. In 1715 the musician and antiquarian Thomas Tudway attributed it to Thomas Morley (Lbm Harley 7337 f. -192v). Another antiquarian, the unreliable Johann Christoph Pepusch, printed it in his Treatise on Harmony (1730) with an attribution to Byrd which, though unfounded, has gained traditional acceptance. This attribution was repeated in the earliest known Continental source, Johann Mattheson's Der vollkommene Capellmeister (1739). The canon forms the basis of the first movement of Concerto III from a set of six Concerti armonici by Count Unico Wilhelm van Wassenaer (formerly attributed to Giovanni Battista Pergolesi or Carlo Ricciotti) published in The Hague in 1739, where it is labelled Canone di Palestrina, and it is printed as an appendix to a set of concertos by Richard Mudge published by John Walsh in 1749. There are surviving copies of the Non nobis Domine canon in the hands of both Mozart and Beethoven. 

Shakespeare, in Henry V Act IV Scene 8, has the king proclaim the singing of both the Non nobis and the Te Deum after the victory at Agincourt. The canon is sung in the 1944 film of Henry V (starring Laurence Olivier) and also in the 1989 film of the same title (starring Kenneth Branagh), though we now know that the retexted version was not in existence as early as 1599, when the play was written. There is no stage direction in the play to indicate the singing of Non nobis Domine , but if Shakespeare had a specific setting in mind  he was probably  thinking anachronistically of a Protestant metrical psalm tune. However, in Hall's Chronicle (1542) Non nobis is sung as part of the complete psalm, presumably to plainsong or faburden.

Modern history
In England the canon came to form part of the repertory of glee clubs in the 18th and 19th centuries, and has traditionally been sung as a grace at public dinners. In the 20th century grace was said or sung before all meals at St Paul's Cathedral School, London, and grace on Sundays and feast days was the sung Non Nobis canon. In modern times it has been quoted by Michael Tippett in his Shires Suite (1970).

For the 1989 film adaptation of Shakespeare's Henry V by Kenneth Branagh, Patrick Doyle composed (and sang) a completely different setting that adapted the words slightly.

Usage 
Non nobis Domine is usually sung as a three-part perpetual canon with the two following voices entering at the lower fourth and lower octave in relation to the lead melody (dux). This is the version given in most of the early sources, but many other solutions are technically possible, a fact which has perhaps contributed much to its enduring appeal.

Non nobis Domine is the official school song of St. Henry's Marist College Durban, South Africa, the PREB school of textile design; Belfast High School, Foxford Comprehensive School, Coventry, Jordanstown, Northern Ireland; Coleraine High School, Coleraine, Northern Ireland; Craigholme Girls School, Glasgow; and The High School For Girls, Gloucester. It is also the school song of Richard Challoner School, London and the Covenant School of Dallas which is a classical, Christian private school in Dallas, TX. It is the song of the St. Charles Garnier College, of Québec City, the oldest comprehensive secondary school in Canada. It is also the official slogan of Guildford County School in Surrey, UK. Non nobis was also the school song of Lady Edridge Grammar School for Girls, Selhurst, Croydon, Surrey. Lady Edridge was next to the Crystal Palace Football Club ground, Clifton Road, and demolished in the 1980s. However, their version was written by Rudyard Kipling, with music by Roger Quilter (links below). This version was also the school song of Purley County Grammar School for Girls, Stoneyfield Road, Old Coulsdon, Surrey which was also demolished in the 1980s. This song was also the school song of Parklands Girls High School, Seacroft, and Cockburn High School, Beeston, Leeds, West Yorkshire. Parklands was the last remaining all girls school in Leeds and was closed in recent years, The Cockburn High School building was closed because of asbestos contamination, but the School was transferred to another area of Beeston. It was also the school hymn of Cirencester Grammar School (1461 to 1966). Mount Temple Comprehensive School in Clontarf, Dublin has it as a school song, and is sung annually at the carol service. Coleraine High School used Non nobis Domine as their school song before it was passed on to Belfast High School on 25 March 2015. In addition Bromley Technical High School, Bromley, Kent had it as the school song in the 1950s. It is currently the school song of Bishop Anstey High School in Port of Spain, Trinidad and Tobago. 

Non Nobis is also the name of a Portuguese hard rock/heavy metal record label founded in 1992 in Tomar, but today are based in Lisbon.

Non nobis Domine is the name of a community choir based in Shannon, County Clare, Ireland.  The choir was formed at St. Patrick's Comprehensive School in 1967 and is directed (since formation) by Mr. Clem Garvey.

References

Sources

External links
 "Non Nobis Domine" by Roger Quilter. The Fort Lewis College Men's Choir – The Fort Lewis College Men's Choir sing "Non Nobis Domine" by Roger Quilter (text by Rudyard Kipling)
 Poetry Cat
 Psalm 115:1 Not to us, O LORD, not to us, but to Your name be the glory, because of Your loving devotion, because of Your faithfulness.
 Home

Latin-language Christian hymns
Vulgate Latin words and phrases